Hobby Workshop is a Canadian instructional television series which aired on CBC Television from 1953 to 1955.

Premise
This how-to series demonstrated how to make various objects with basic tools. Host Tom Martin was an art supervisor in Toronto's school system.

Scheduling
This 15-minute series was broadcast at various times (Eastern) as follows:

References

External links
 

CBC Television original programming
1953 Canadian television series debuts
1955 Canadian television series endings
Black-and-white Canadian television shows